Caralluma adscendens is a succulent plant in the family Apocynaceae. Its distribution ranges from India and Sri Lanka through the Arabian peninsula to North Africa and the Sahel.

In home gardens
Caralluma adscendens Some people in Pakistan have started to grow it in earthen plastic Containers and are producing fresh vegetables for their consumption.

Use
Caralluma adscendens has been eaten in rural India for centuries, raw, as a vegetable with spices, or preserved in chutneys and pickles, and is often found as a roadside shrub or boundary marker.

Consumer issues
Various diet pills claiming to contain Caralluma fimbriata extracts are marketed for weight loss. A study published in 2015 showed the supplement to be well tolerated, but to have no clinical effect compared to a placebo at the supposedly therapeutic dose of 1g daily.

Chemistry
The key phytochemical constituents of the herb are pregnane glycosides, flavone glycosides, megastigmane glycosides, and saponins.

References

External links

Asclepiadoideae
Taxa named by Robert Brown (botanist, born 1773)